Surrey County Cricket Club is one of eighteen county teams in England that play first-class cricket. Below is a complete list of those who have served as President of the club. The position is an unpaid honorary one, the President acting as a figurehead. Those chosen are distinguished supporters of the club from all walks of life, including politics, business and entertainment, as well as notable former Surrey players and officials. From 1978 to 2012, Presidents usually served a one-year term, from the AGM held in March or April of the year specified until the following year's AGM, but in recent years a two-year term has been the norm.

References 
Surrey CCC Yearbook (various years - the 1980 Yearbook has a complete list of officials up to that date)

Presidents